Eleni Ioannou (January 13, 1984 – August 24, 2004) was a member of the Greek judo team. She was due to compete at the 2004 Summer Olympics.
 
On August 7, 2004, she jumped from a third floor balcony of an apartment building, then spent the next 17 days in critical condition until she died.

The suicide incident occurred shortly after an episode with Eleni's boyfriend, Giorgos Chrisostomides. On August 9, he jumped from the same balcony, but recovered from his injuries.

External links
Eleni Ioannou - BBC

1984 births
2004 suicides
Suicides by jumping in Greece
Greek female judoka
2004 deaths
Sportspeople from Athens